Phaedra 2005 is the ninety-first release by Tangerine Dream. It is a re-recording of their 1974 album Phaedra.

Track listing

Personnel
 Edgar Froese— composer, musician, producer
 Thorsten Quaeschning— musician (flute) on Sequent C

Additional personnel
 Peter Baumann— composer
 Christopher Franke— composer

References

2005 albums
Tangerine Dream albums